The Latvia national badminton team represents Latvia in international badminton team competitions. Like many post-Soviet states, the Latvian national team was formed after the dissolution of the Soviet Union. The national team is controlled by the Latvian Badminton Federation.

The national team competed in the Sudirman Cup until 2007. The men's and women's team compete in the European Men's and Women's Team Badminton Championships.

Participation in BWF competitions

Sudirman Cup

Participation in European Team Badminton Championships

Men's Team

Women's Team

Mixed Team

Participation in Helvetia Cup 
The Helvetia Cup or European B Team Championships was a European mixed team championship in badminton. The first Helvetia Cup tournament took place in Zurich, Switzerland in 1962. The tournament took place every two years from 1971 until 2007, after which it was dissolved. Latvia competed under the Soviet flag in 1977 and 1979. The national team only competed once after the dissolution of the USSR.

Participation in European Junior Team Badminton Championships
Mixed Team

Current squad 
The following players were selected to represent Latvia at the 2020 European Men's and Women's Team Badminton Championships.

Male players
Andis Berzins
Ivo Keiss
Pauls Gureckis
Viesturs Bajars
Niks Podosinoviks
Toms Preinbergs

Female players
Kristīne Šefere
Liāna Lencēviča
Jekaterina Romanova
Monika Radovska
Ieva Pope
Anna Kupča
Annija Rulle-Titava
Una Berga
Diāna Stognija

References

Badminton
National badminton teams
Badminton in Latvia